Monk Fryston Hall is a Grade II* listed country house standing in 66 acres of parkland in Monk Fryston, Selby, North Yorkshire, England.

The hall was originally built for Selby Abbey in the 13th century in Magnesian Limestone with a stone slate roof. It was heavily restored c.1740, altered again in 1897 and an additional range added in the 20th century.

Monk Fryston was bought in 1680 by the Hemsworth family and the family occupied the hall for several generations. In 1946 it was sold to an S.W. Tinsdale who converted the hall to an hotel, selling it on in 1954 to the 10th Duke of Rutland. After changing hands twice since then it is now being run as a  hotel known as Monk Fryston Hall Hotel.

References

Country houses in North Yorkshire
Grade II* listed buildings in North Yorkshire